Mary Daisy Arnold (c. 1873 – August 13, 1955) was a botanical artist who worked for the United States Department of Agriculture (USDA) for over thirty-five years, painting watercolors of a wide variety of fruits. She is one of the three most prolific artists whose work is now preserved in the USDA's Pomological Watercolor Collection.

Biography
Arnold studied art in New York and began her long career with USDA in 1904, becoming part of a part of a select cadre of illustrators that included Deborah Griscom Passmore, Amanda Newton, Elsie Lower, Royal Charles Steadman, and J. Marion Shull. Very little else is known about Arnold. With respect to her USDA career, this may be due partly to the fact that records of the National Personnel Record Center in St. Louis dating from before 1921 have been destroyed.

The 1060 watercolors that Arnold painted for USDA date from between 1908 and 1940. Arnold's subjects included many varieties of apples, strawberries, stone fruit, and citrus, as well as other fruits like figs, papayas, and persimmons. She also did some related work such as mounting and coloring lantern slides.

Arnold lived in the Washington, D.C., area. Outside of her USDA job, she painted landscapes in oil.

Gallery

References

External links

USDA Pomological Watercolor Collection

Botanical illustrators
1955 deaths
20th-century American painters
20th-century American women artists
American women illustrators
United States Department of Agriculture people
1870s births
American illustrators